Alfred Hoyt Bill (1879–1964) was an American writer. His non-fiction mostly dealt with American history while his fiction (some of it aimed at children) was set in different periods of British and French history.

One of his later works of fiction, The Wolf in the Garden, was republished by Centaur Press in 1972.

Bibliography

Fiction
 The Clutch of the Corsican: A Tale of the Days of Downfall of the Great Napoleon. Boston, Little, Brown, 1925, 241p.
 Highroads of Peril: Being the Adventures of Franklin Darlington, American, Among the Secret Agents of the Exiled Louis XVIII, King of France. Boston, Little, Brown and Company, 1926, 322p.
 Alas, Poor Yorick! Being Three Hitherto Unrecorded Adventures In the Life of the Reverend Laurence Sterne, A.B., Vicar of Coxwold In Yorkshire, Etc., Etc.. Boston, Little, Brown, and Co., 1927, 263p.
 The Red Prior's Legacy: The Story of the Adventures of an American Boy in the French Revolution. London, Longmans, Green, 1929, 256p.
 The Wolf In the Garden. New York, Longmans, Green, 1931, 287p.
 The Ring of Danger, A Tale of Elizabethan England. New York, A.A. Knopf, 1948, 259p.

Non-fiction
 Astrophel; or, The Life and Death of the Renowned Sir Philip Sidney. New York, Toronto, Farrar & Rinehart, Inc., 1937, 372p.
 The Beleaguered City: Richmond, 1861-1865, New York, Knopf, 1946, 313p.
 Rehearsal for Conflict; the War with Mexico, 1846-1848. New York, A.A. Knopf, 1947, 342p.
 The Campaign of Princeton, 1776-1777, Princeton, N.J., Princeton Univ. Press, 1948, 145p.
 Valley Forge; the Making of an Army. New York, Harper, 1952, 259p.
 A House called Morven, Its Role in American History, 1701-1954 (with Walter E. Edge). Princeton, N.J., Princeton University Press, 1954, 206p.
 1978 edition from Princeton University Press (228p.) was revised by Constance M. Greiff.
 Horsemen, Blue and Gray: a Pictorial History (with James Ralph Johnson, illustrated by Hirst Dilon Milhollen). New York, Oxford University Press, 1960, 236p.
 New Jersey and the Revolutionary War. Princeton, N.J., Van Nostrand, The New Jersey historical series, v. 11, 1964, 117p.
 "Fighting Bob": the Life and Exploits of Commodore Robert Field Stockton, United States Navy. Princeton, Princeton University Library, 1966.

References

External links
 

1879 births
1964 deaths
20th-century American novelists
American male novelists
20th-century American male writers
20th-century American non-fiction writers
American male non-fiction writers